The Copa Cidade do Natal, formerly known as Taça Cidade de Natal, is a trophy organized by the Federação Norte-rio-grandense de Futebol (FNF) who currently represents the winners of the first round of the Campeonato Potiguar.

Champions 
List of the champions of the Copa Cidade do Natal of 2008 to 2022:

Taça Cidade de Natal

Copa Cidade do Natal

Titles by Team

See also

Campeonato Potiguar
Copa RN
Copa Rio Grande do Norte

References

External links 
 Official Site of the FNF

Campeonato Potiguar